Independence Lake may refer to:

 Independence Lake (California)
 Independence Lake (Colorado)

See also
 Lake Independence (disambiguation)
 Independence Lakes, a chain of lakes in Idaho